Sara Nicole Downing (born April 26, 1979) is an American actress best known for her starring role as Jane Cahill in the 2001 television series Dead Last.

Filmography

Film

Television

References

External links
 
 Sara Downing on Myspace

1979 births
Living people
Actresses from Washington, D.C.
American film actresses
American television actresses
20th-century French actresses
21st-century French actresses
21st-century American women